Roskilde Festival 2006 with more than 79,000 paying visitors (as well as approximately 20,000 volunteer day workers), the 2006 festival was the biggest in Europe for the year. With only one day of rain and the rest of the week being sunny, this festival also ranks as one with a lucky weather. Changes from last year include a new swimming lake - which proved to be very successful due to the warm and sunny weather - and a lounge stage called Bar'n. Another significant change was the introduction of new sound systems that reduced the noise levels beyond the audience area. This also included the removal of the big sound towers at Orange, these changes and the new surround sound system for Orange, made The Dark Side of the Moon one of the most memorable moments of the Festival. Some of the performing artists were Bob Dylan, Roger Waters, Guns N' Roses, Tool, The Strokes, Deftones, Morrissey, Franz Ferdinand, Kanye West, Placebo, Arctic Monkeys, Sigur Rós and the Streets. For a complete list, see below.

Band list

 200 (FO)
 Acustic (DK)
 Amplifier (UK)
 Anga Díaz Echu Mingua (CUB)
 Steve Angello (S)
 Animal Collective (US)
 Arctic Monkeys (UK)
 Astral Projection Session (DK)
 Badun (DK)
 Kenneth Bager & Hess Is More (DK)
 Balkan Beat Box (US/UKR/ISR)
 Band Ane (DK)
 Barra Head (DK)
 Bellowhead (UK)
 Birdy Nam Nam (FR)
 Bola 8
 Buda (DK)
 Bullet for My Valentine (UK)
 Burst (S)
 Cabruêra (BRA)
 The Cheaters (NO)
 Chris Lee (NO)
 Dorit Chrysler (A/US)
 Ba Cissoko (GUI)
 Clap Your Hands Say Yeah (US)
 Coheed and Cambria (cancelled)
 Coldcut (UK)
 Death Cab for Cutie (US)
 Deftones (US)
 Deltahead (S)
 dEUS (BE)
 Toumani Diabaté's Symmetric Orchestra (MALI)
 Diplo vs. A-Trak (US/CAN)
 Disco Ensemble (FIN)
 DK7 (IRL/S)
 Jakob Domino (DK)
 Bob Dylan (US)
 Dälek (US)
 Dúné (DK)
 Editors (UK)
 Eivør (FO)
 Evergrey (S)
 The Ex (NL)
 EX PXM (DK)
 Fat Freddys Drop (NZ)
 Chuck Fenda & The Living Fire Family (JAM) (Aflyst)
 Figurines (DK)
 The Five Corners Quintet (FIN)
 Floetry (UK) (aflyst)
 Franz Ferdinand (UK)
 Free Hole Negro (CUB)
 Front 242 (BE)
 George Clinton Parliament/Funkadelic (US)
 Gogol Bordello (US/UKR/ISR)
 Goldfrapp (UK) (cancelled)
 Pete Gooding (UK)
 Christophe Goze (FR)
 DJ Grazzhoppa's DJ Bigband (BE)
 Guns N' Roses (US)
 Hammond Rens (DK/US)
 Happy Mondays (UK)
 Hatesphere (DK)
 Four Tet & Steve Reid (UK/US)
 HIM (FIN)
 Hinsidan (DK/S)
 Hanna Hukkelberg (NO)
 Hyper (UK)
 Immortal Technique (US)
 Infadels (UK)
 Jab Mica och El (DK)
 JR Ewing (NO)
 Kaizers Orchestra (NO)
 Kashmir (DK)
 KILLL (NO)
 L.O.C. (DK)
 Mad Caddies (US)
 Madvig (DK)
 Magtens Korridorer (DK)
 Matisyahu (US)
 Mi & l'Au (FIN/FR)
 Nicolai Molbeck (DK)
 Morrissey (UK)
 Annie Nightingale (UK)
 Alva Noto & Ryuichi Sakamoto (D/JAP)
 Opeth (S)
 Placebo (UK)
 Primal Scream (UK)
 Raz Ohara (DK)
 Rúben Ramos and The Mexican Revolution (MEX/US)
 Michael Rune & Kasper Krump (DK)
 Ronin (DK)
 Josh Rouse (US)
 Rumpistol (DK)
 Scissor Sisters (US)
 Seeed (G)
 Serena Maneesh (N)
 Sergent Garcia (FR)
 The Seven Mile Journey (DK)
 Anoushka Shankar (IND)
 Shout Out Louds (S)
 Sigur Rós (ISL)
 Silver Jews (US)
 Skin (UK)
 Allan Skov - Soulclub (DK)
 DJ Sneak (US)
 Solár (DK)
 Snöleoparden (DK)
 Song To The Siren (DK)
 Sonny Loose (DK)
 Spank Rock (US)
 Spleen United (DK)
 Stella Polaris Sound System (DK)
 Sterling (DK)
 The Streets (UK)
 The Strokes (US)
 Superdiscount Live feat. Etienne de Crécy, Alex Gopher og Julien Delfaud (FR)
 Tech N9ne (US)
 The Thing (N/S)
 Joakim Thåström (S)
 Tied & Tickled Trio (D)
 Tiga (CAN)
 Tool (US)
 Track72 (DK)
 Trivium (US)
 Two Gallants (DK)
 Under Byen (DK)
 The Unit (DK)
 Jens Unmack (DK)
 Up Hygh (S)
 Veto (DK)
 Radio Soulwax presents: Soulwax, 2ManyDJs, Justice (BE/FR)
 Ricardo Villalobos (CHL/D)
 Vincent Van Go Go (DK)
 Volbeat (DK)
 Vong Ngyet/Wishing Upon The Moon (VNM/DK)
 Rufus Wainwright (US)
 Martha Wainwright (US)
 Roger Waters (UK) (Performed Pink Floyd's The Dark Side of the Moon)
 Kanye West (US)
 Who made Who (DK)
 Why?
 Jenny Wilson (S)
 Wir sind Helden (D)
 Wolfkin (DK)
 Wolfmother (AUS)
 Yellowish (DK)
 Zdob şi Zdub (MDA)

References

Roskilde Festival by year
2006 in Danish music
2006 music festivals